Grahl is a surname. Notable people with this surname include:

 August Grahl (1791 – 1868), German portrait painter and miniaturist
 Denise Grahl (born 1993), German Paralympic swimmer
 Francisco Grahl (born 1992), Argentine footballer
 Jens Grahl (born 1988), German footballer
 John Grahl (born 1946), Scottish academic and professor
 John Grahl (comedian), Ghanaian comedian
 Steven Grahl, English cathedral organist
 Viola Grahl (born 1966), German field hockey player